"The Same Moon" is a song by Phil Collins from his sixth solo studio album Dance into the Light (1996). Written by Collins, and produced by him and Hugh Padgham, the song was released on October 20, 1997, as the sixth and final single from the album. Like his previous single, "No Matter Who", it received only a limited release. The song was only released in Germany, where it reached number 87. The song managed to reach the top-ten in Poland, peaking at number six. No music video was made for the song. The single contains B-sides that were available on previous singles from the album.

The B-sides were a live version of the song "Always" from the Montreux Jazz Festival and the unreleased track "I Don't Want to Go." The latter one however was also released as the B-side of "It's in Your Eyes" single.

Charts

Credits 
 Phil Collins – drums, vocals, keyboards 
 Brad Cole – organ
 Daryl Stuermer – lead guitar
 Ronnie Caryl – rhythm guitar
 Nathan East – bass
 Amy Keys – backing vocals 
 Arnold McCuller – backing vocals

References

Phil Collins songs
Song recordings produced by Phil Collins
Song recordings produced by Hugh Padgham
1997 songs
1997 singles